= Atlas 200 =

Atlas 200 may refer to:

- ARCA races at Salem, at Salem Speedway.
- ARCA races at Madison, at Madison International Raceway.
